Christopher Donnell King (born July 24, 1969) is a retired American professional basketball player. He most notably played in the National Basketball Association (NBA).

College career
Born in Newton Grove, North Carolina, King got his start at playing high school basketball for the Hobbton High School Wildcats, in Newton Grove, North Carolina. He then played college basketball at Wake Forest University, where he played with the Wake Forest Demon Deacons, from 1988 to 1992.

Professional career
King was selected by the Seattle SuperSonics, in 2nd round, with the 45th overall pick of 1992 NBA Draft. King played in 15 games for the Sonics, during the 1993–94 season, where he made his only NBA playoff appearance. He was also a member of the Vancouver Grizzlies' inaugural season (1995–96), for whom he played in 80 out of 82 games, and starting in 66 of them. He averaged 7.9 points and 3.6 rebounds per game that season. During that season, King grabbed an NBA career-high 14 rebounds, to go along with 21 points, in a 79–94 loss to the Utah Jazz. King tipped in a Byron Scott missed shot at the buzzer, in the team's home opener, to beat the Minnesota Timberwolves in overtime. His final appearance in the league was during the 1999 lockout season, in which he played in a total of eight games with the Utah Jazz. Upon leaving the NBA, King moved to Roanoke,Virginia working as a security guard for a local supermarket.

References

External links
NBA & college stats @ basketballreference.com

1969 births
Living people
African-American basketball players
American expatriate basketball people in Canada
American expatriate basketball people in Chile
American expatriate basketball people in France
American expatriate basketball people in Greece
American expatriate basketball people in Israel
American expatriate basketball people in Japan
American expatriate basketball people in the Philippines
American expatriate basketball people in Romania
American expatriate basketball people in Spain
American expatriate basketball people in Turkey
American expatriate basketball people in Ukraine
American men's basketball players
Aris B.C. players
Baloncesto Fuenlabrada players
Baloncesto Málaga players
Barangay Ginebra San Miguel players
Basketball players from North Carolina
Hapoel Tel Aviv B.C. players
La Crosse Bobcats players
Le Mans Sarthe Basket players
Liga ACB players
Utsunomiya Brex players
Maccabi Rishon LeZion basketball players
Orléans Loiret Basket players
Pallacanestro Cantù players
Paris Racing Basket players
People from Sampson County, North Carolina
Philippine Basketball Association imports
Piratas de Quebradillas players
Rockford Lightning players
Seattle SuperSonics draft picks
Seattle SuperSonics players
SLUC Nancy Basket players
Small forwards
Utah Jazz players
Vancouver Grizzlies players
Wake Forest Demon Deacons men's basketball players
21st-century African-American people
20th-century African-American sportspeople